The Buffalo River, located in Northern Arkansas, was the first National River to be designated in the United States. The lower  flow within the boundaries of an area managed by the National Park Service, where the stream is designated the Buffalo National River. The river flows through Newton, Searcy, Marion, and Baxter Counties, from west to east. The river originates in the highest part of the Boston Mountains of the Ozarks, flows out onto the Springfield Plateau near the historic community of Erbie, and finally crosses a portion of the Salem Plateau just before joining the White River. The Park is home to the state's only elk herd. The upper section of the river in the Ozark National Forest is managed by the U.S. Forest Service and is designated as a National Scenic River and a National Wild River; that section is not part of the area managed as a park by the Park Service but is managed as a part of the Ozark National Forest.

The Buffalo National River was established by an Act of Congress on March 1, 1972, ending the recurring plans of the U.S. Army Corps of Engineers to construct one or more dams on the river. The National River designation protects natural rivers from industrial uses, impoundments and other obstructions that may change the natural character of the river or disrupt the natural habitat for the flora and fauna that live in or near the river. Three segments totaling  were designated the Buffalo National River Wilderness in 1975.

The river flows north through Boxley to Ponca, where it then begins an eastward trek across northern Arkansas to its confluence with the White River on the Marion-Baxter County line. Advanced canoeists and kayakers often refer to the  section upriver from Boxley as the Hailstone River. This extremely challenging section of the river is floatable only during periods of high water and should be attempted only by those with solid whitewater skills.

Along the upper river, the gradient is steep and the water is fast, leveling and slowing as the river runs its course. At one point, a  hike from the river up a narrow, boxed canyon leads to a  waterfall, Hemmed-In-Hollow Falls, the highest of its kind between the Southern Appalachians and the Rockies. The river's current also gives life to well over 300 species of fish, insects, freshwater mussels, and aquatic plants.

The Buffalo National River is a popular camping, hiking, canoeing, and fishing destination. Visitors may bring their own canoes or rent from several independent concessioners. Camping is generally allowed throughout the park with the following exceptions: the Hemmed-in-Hollow area, on Big Bluff, in historical structures, on private property within the park, or within  of any trail or watercourse. Camping is, however, permitted on gravel bars and sand bars along the river. In addition, the National Park Service has a number of "developed" campgrounds along the river.

The National Park Service headquarters for the Buffalo National River is located in Harrison, Arkansas.

Major access areas

Boxley Bridge – located on the upper end of the river along Arkansas Highway 21.  Boxley provides access to the Upper Buffalo Wilderness Area within the Ozark National Forest.  Provides river access
Lost Valley - located on Arkansas Highway 43 between Arkansas 21 and Ponca.
Ponca – Location of Beaver Jim Villines Boyhood Home.  Ponca retains one of the old ‘low water’ bridges over the Buffalo.  All boaters must portage over this barrier. Provides river access
Steel Creek – is located on the upstream side of the Ponca section of the Wilderness.  Provides river access
Kyles Landing – is located on the downstream side and across the river from the Ponca Wilderness area. This area was once the home of early frontiersman David Conrad Hennegar "Coon" Arbaugh.  Provides river access
Erbie - Erbie retains one of the old ‘low water’ bridges over the Buffalo.  Provides river access
Ozark - Provides river access
Pruitt Ranger Station – is on Arkansas Highway 7 at the top of the hill overlooking the picnic area and foot access to the river.  For boat access, you need to cross the high bridge on Arkansas 7 and use Pruitt Landing.
Pruitt Landing – is located just downstream from Pruitt Ranger Station.  Provides river access
Hasty – located off of Arkansas Highway 123, just south of the Hasty community. Provides river access
Carver – located on Hwy 123 between Hasty and Piercetown (Arkansas Hwy 74). Provides river access
Mount Hersey – is accessible from unimproved roads.  From this access point, ‘Tha Nars’ (Narrows) and Skull Bluff are reached downstream. Provides river access
Woolum - Provides river access
Tyler Bend Visitor Center – is the primary public contact area.  It’s just off of U.S. 65.  There is a full-service visitor center, picnic area, campground and ranger station. Provides river access  Additionally, the ‘Colliers Homestead’ preserves a record of life in the mountains
Grinders Ferry – is located at the Highway 65 Bridge over the Buffalo River.  Provides river access
Provides river access
Maumee North – is on the north side of the river and west of Maumee South.  It is accessed by an unimproved road. Provides river access
Maumee South – is on the south side of the river and is accessed from an unimproved road beyond the end of the pavement on County Road 49.
Dillards Ferry – is located on Arkansas Highway 14 at the bridge over the Buffalo River. Provides river access
Buffalo Point Ranger Station – is at the end of the pavement on Arkansas Highway 268. Provides river access
Rushland – is reached by an unimproved road beyond the end of the pavement on County 26. It provides access across the river to the Leatherwood Wilderness in the Ozark National Forest. Provides river access
Buffalo City – is located outside the National River at the junction of the Buffalo River with its parent the White River.  Buffalo City is located off the US 62-412 in Mountain Home on Arkansas Highway 162, about 12 miles from Mountain Home. Provides river access, primarily as the last take out for the Buffalo River along with boat rentals, camping, and cabins.

Hog farm contamination 
In 2012, C&H Hog Farms was granted a permit to operate on a major tributary of the Buffalo River. The facility contained over 6,500 hogs, as well as storage areas for their manure. In 2019, the company reached a deal with the State of Arkansas to cease operations on the river. The governor of Arkansas, Asa Hutchison, subsequently announced a moratorium on large confined animal feeding operations in the river's watershed. In January of 2020, the Arkansas Legislature struck down rules set by Hutchison banning similar operations on the river.

See also 
 Buffalo River Trail
Buffalo River State Park Historic District
Big Buffalo Valley Historic District
Rush Historic District
Parker-Hickman Farm Historic District

References

Further reading 
 The Buffalo River in Black and White. University of Arkansas Press, 1998. 
 The Buffalo Flows: The Story of Our First National River. University of Arkansas Press, 2009.
The Battle for the Buffalo River: The Story of America's First National River. University of Arkansas Press, 2010.

External links 

National Park Service Buffalo River webpage
Map of the Buffalo National River, PDF format, 226KB
Buffalo National River information

Rivers of Arkansas
Bodies of water of the Ozarks
Protected areas of the U.S. Interior Highlands
Protected areas established in 1972
National Park Service areas in Arkansas
National Park Service Wild and Scenic Rivers
Tributaries of the White River (Arkansas–Missouri)
Protected areas of Newton County, Arkansas
Protected areas of Searcy County, Arkansas
Protected areas of Marion County, Arkansas
Protected areas of Baxter County, Arkansas
Ozark–St. Francis National Forest
Bodies of water of Newton County, Arkansas
Bodies of water of Searcy County, Arkansas
Rivers of Marion County, Arkansas
Rivers of Baxter County, Arkansas
1972 establishments in Arkansas